Count  was a Japanese samurai of the late Edo period who became a government official in the Meiji, Taishō, and Shōwa eras. Younger brother of Tokugawa Iesato. His childhood name was Bannosuke (群之助).

Served as a member of the House of Peers and the Board of Trustees of Gakushūin. In the pre-1945 nobility, he held the rank of count.

Family
 Father: Tokugawa Yoshiyori
 Mother: Takai Takeko
 Wives: 
 Kyoko, Daughter of 15th shōgun Yoshinobu
 Shimazu Tomoko, Daughter of Shimazu Tadayoshi (2nd)
 Children:
 Sumiko married Naoyoshi Mizoguchi by Kyoko
 Tokiko married Tsuchiya Kennao by Kyoko
 Tsuyako married Tachibana Kantoku by Kyoko
 Shuko married Tokugawa Takesada of Matsudo-Tokugawa Family by Kyoko
 Satonari Tokugawa by Tomoko
 Keiko married Okubo Kan’ichi by Tomoko

References

1865 births
1941 deaths
Kazoku
Members of the House of Peers (Japan)
Samurai
Tokugawa clan